Ferocactus pilosus, also known as Mexican lime cactus (Biznaga De Lima) or Mexican fire barrel, is a species of cactus in North America.

Distribution

It is native to the Méxican states of Coahuila, Durango, Nuevo Leon, San Luis Potosí, and Tamaulipas.

See also

References

pilosus
Cacti of Mexico
Endemic flora of Mexico
Flora of the Chihuahuan Desert
Flora of Coahuila
Flora of Durango
Flora of Nuevo León
Flora of San Luis Potosí
Flora of Tamaulipas
Flora of the Mexican Plateau